Santanaraptor (meaning "Santana Formation thief") is a genus of tyrannosauroid theropod dinosaur that lived in South America during the Early Cretaceous (late Aptian-early Albian), about 112 million years ago.

Discovery
The type species is S. placidus, first described by Kellner in 1999.

Description

The holotype (MN 4802-V) is a juvenile partial skeleton consisting of three caudal vertebrae with chevrons, ischia, femora, tibia, fibula, pes, and soft tissue. The fossilized tissue includes a thin epidermis, muscle fibers, and possibly blood vessels. Skin impressions under the left foot are also preserved, showing scales. It was unearthed in 1996 from the Romualdo Formation (Santana Group) in the Ceará State, northeastern Brazil. The fossil consists of bones from the pelvis, hindlimbs, and tail. These provide little information on its overall appearance. However, it was definitely a coelurosaur, and a few of its details suggest that it might be a member of the tyrannosauroids. It is presumed to be similar to Dilong and Guanlong in that it had long arms, three fingered hands, and slim hindlimbs.

Classification
Santanaraptor was originally thought to be a maniraptoran theropod when it was first discovered. However, it is now thought to be a basal coelurosaur based on several features present on the femur. Santanaraptor was tabulated by Holtz (2004) as the first tyrannosauroid known from Gondwana, a position also found by Delcourt and Grillo (2018). However, this position has been criticised, as the supposed tyrannosauroid characters are widely distributed in Coelurosauria, and several aspects of the foot are more similar to noasaurids.

External links
 A photograph of the fossil specimen, published by Rafael Delcourt's twitter account

See also

 Timeline of tyrannosaur research

References

Tyrannosaurs
Early Cretaceous dinosaurs of South America
Cretaceous Brazil
Fossils of Brazil
 
Albian life
Aptian life
Fossil taxa described in 1999
Taxa named by Alexander Kellner